Mohammad Chairul Rifan (born 3 December 1989) is an Indonesian professional footballer who plays as a defender for Liga 2 club Sulut United.

Club career

Madura FC
In 2018, Chairul Rifan signed a contract with Indonesian Liga 2 club Madura. He made 26 league appearances for Madura FC.

PSCS Cilacap
He was signed for PSCS Cilacap to play in the Liga 2 in the 2019 season. Rifan made 27 league appearances for PSCS Cilacap.

Persiraja Banda Aceh
In January 2022, Rifan signed a contract with Liga 1 club Persiraja Banda Aceh. He made his league debut in a 1–0 loss against PSIS Semarang on 12 January 2022 as a substitute for Assanur Rijal in the 54th minute at the Kompyang Sujana Stadium, Denpasar.

References

External links
 
 Chairul Rifan at Liga Indonesia

1989 births
Living people
Indonesian footballers
Liga 1 (Indonesia) players
Pelita Bandung Raya players
Association football defenders
People from Bondowoso Regency
Sportspeople from East Java